Ibón de Escalar is a lake in the Province of Huesca, northeastern Spain.

References

Escalar
Geography of the Province of Huesca